Samuel Proof (born May 24, 1973) is an American actor and writer known for his role as Raz on the television series Tim and Eric Awesome Show, Great Job!, and for his award-nominated webseries The Sam Proof Show and The Path to Publication.

Proof was born in  New Jersey and raised in Bala Cynwyd, Pennsylvania, where he attended Lower Merion High School. He moved to Los Angeles in January 2000. While in Los Angeles, he has spent many years in the entertainment industry working on independent films and both reality and documentary television shows.

Ford selected Proof as a Fiesta Agent for the 2011 Ford Fiesta Movement.

Moderated the 'Celebrate the Web 2' Forum in San Diego, Comic Con 2010

Filmography

Stage

References

External links

Official Sam Proof Site
SamProof Youtube Channel
 Video Interview Mahalo daily Video Link
 Video Interview BlakkDuv Video Link
 Video Interview Anthrovlog Video Link
 Audio Interview JOJCast Audio Link

1973 births
American male comedians
21st-century American comedians
American male film actors
Living people
Male actors from Pennsylvania
People from Bala Cynwyd, Pennsylvania
Lower Merion High School alumni